Kinetic sculpture races are organized contests of human-powered amphibious all-terrain works of art. The original cross country event, the World Championship Great Arcata To Ferndale Cross Country Kinetic Sculpture Race, now known as the Kinetic Grand Championship in Humboldt County, California, is also called the  "Triathlon of the Art World" because art and engineering are combined with physical endurance during a three-day cross country race that includes sand, mud, pavement, a bay crossing, a river crossing and major hills.

Race locations
Kinetic sculpture races are held in many locations:

Humboldt County, California hosts the annual Kinetic Grand Championship each May over Memorial Day weekend. It spans  over three days.
Baltimore, Maryland – the East Coast Championship sponsored by the American Visionary Art Museum covers  through downtown Baltimore and the harbor.
Gainesville, Florida – The Menagerie in Motion Kinetic Derby in 2016 became the Southeast's first and only kinetic sculpture derby. The event occurs annually on the last weekend in February to coincide with Chimera Fest.
Lowell, Massachusetts – New England's, Lowell Kinetic Sculpture Race, keeping the tradition alive with much fun through the streets of Lowell, a giant mud pit and navigating the Merrimack River. The third weekend of September.
Port Townsend, Washington
Corvallis, Oregon – as part of Da Vinci Days festival.
Ventura, California – benefits the Turning Point Foundation.
Klamath Falls, Oregon The race is held the last full weekend in June.
Philadelphia, Pennsylvania hosts a kinetic sculpture derby as part of the Trenton Avenue arts festival in the neighborhood of Kensington, Philadelphia, Pennsylvania.
Coeur d' Alene, ID – Gizmotion Celebration of Creativity

There are other kinetic challenges, derbies and so on which follow some of the rules and traditions of kinetic sculpture racing, but are not an official part of it.

Races were formerly held in Poland, Geraldton, Western Australia, Clearlake, California and Prescott Valley, Arizona

World Championship

The concept of kinetic sculpture racing originated in Ferndale, California in 1969 when local sculptor Hobart Brown "improved" the appearance of his son's tricycle by welding on two additional wheels and other embellishments. Seeing this "Pentacycle," fellow artist Jack Mays challenged him to a race. Others later joined in creating a field of twelve machines that inaugurated the first race down Ferndale's Main Street during the town's annual art festival. Neither Hobart Brown nor Mays won; instead, the first winner was Bob Brown of Eureka, California whose sculpture was a smoke-emitting Turtle that laid eggs.  The race received broad publicity when photos of Congressman Don Clausen riding the Pentacycle were seen nationally.

The event was repeated in 1970, and the course subsequently expanded to include cross-country terrain. When affiliated races were initiated in other cities and the course grew, the Ferndale event became the World Championship, and has grown into the largest single event in Humboldt County.

During the 1970s, the race adopted its present three-day, cross-country format and became the "Triathlon of the Art World." Machines tackled mud, sand, water, gravel and pavement. Stan Bennett's book Crazy Contraptions chronicles the first five years of the race. In the early 1980s, Hobart Brown was referred to as the "Glorious Founder of the Kinetic Race" in a spectators' brochure.

As the 1980s ended, a mineral water company began sponsoring the race, which adopted a family-friendly approach. Soon after, a local manufacturer of sports racks and car storage boxes became interested in the race. The sponsors' financial support – especially the creation of the Kinetic Lab in Arcata – took the race to a new level of art and engineering.

During the 1990s, the race matured. Many contestants were younger than the race, having grown up with its philosophy, "Adults having fun so children will want to grow older," coined by Brown. As age and crippling arthritis limited his activities, he sold the race rights, the kinetic chicken logo and the trademark "For the Glory" slogan to a new not-for-profit agency called the Humboldt Kinetic Association in 2002.

Changing economics caused the sport rack company to leave the area and the water company to end their sponsorship. With no major sponsor and several years of county budget cutbacks reflecting statewide budget problems, the race experienced difficulties. In early 2007, Humboldt Kinetic Association abjured responsibility for the race. Race volunteers rapidly created Kinetic Universe, a new not-for-profit, to manage the 2007 race. It was at this time that the races title was changed to Kinetic Grand Championship. In 2009, the New Belgium Brewing Company became a sponsor. In 2013, the annual Mother's Day Kinetic Klassic children's event moved from Ferndale to Eureka's waterfront Halverson Park.

The race begins on Arcata Plaza with the Saturday noon whistle; the race goes through Eureka and Loleta before reaching the finish line on the third day on Main Street in Ferndale. The race is broadcast live on local radio station KHUM.

East Coast Championship in Baltimore

In 1999, the American Visionary Art Museum (AVAM) in Baltimore worked with Hobart Brown to start the first race in the Eastern United States, and has sponsored the race every year since. On 4 May 2019, 22 teams brought 25 sculptures to Baltimore for the 21st East Coast Championship. With the 2020 race postponed due to the COVID-19 pandemic, the next race was scheduled Saturday, 1 May 2021. However, the 2021 edition was held as a "mini-race" owing to social distancing guidelines. Twenty teams participated in the 22nd East Coast Championship on Saturday, 7 May 2022.

In contrast to the rural flair of Humboldt County, the Baltimore race spans the city's urban center and is completed in a single day. The  race begins with morning opening ceremonies and the Le Mans Start down Federal Hill to AVAM on the south side of the Inner Harbor, continues past well-known sites including the Maryland Science Center, Harborplace, the USS Constellation, the National Aquarium, and Fells Point, enters the water at Canton, continues with sand and mud challenges at Patterson Park, then through Butchers Hill and downtown to the finish line at AVAM in mid- to late-afternoon. An awards ceremony at AVAM concludes the event.

In 2002, Baltimore's race included a loop around the Patterson Park ice skating rink, a challenging extension of the all-terrain aspect.
However, in the years since then the race occurs later in the spring to benefit from warmer weather – after the rink closes for the season.

Rutabaga Queens and other numeraries
Early in the history of the Championship, contestants began to select an annual Rutabaga Queen. with active Queens Pigtunia Swineheart (83/84), Queen Denise Ryles 2001, Queen Mo "Mo Betta" Burke 2002, Queen Mair "Jane Doe" Dodd 2003, Queen Monica Topping 2004, Queen Shaye "Flamebouyant Femme Fatale" Harty 2005, Queen Harmony "Foxy Biloxi" Groves 2006, Queen Emma "Emma the Emchantress" Breacain 2007, Queen Kati "Lotta Paintbuckets" Texas 2008, Queen Jermaine "Jermajesty" Brubaker 2009, Queen Jennifer "Dinah Might" Thelander 2010, Queen Natalie Arroyo "G-ma" 2011, and Queen Wendy "Sohotshe" Burns LaRutabaga" 2012.

The 2004, 2005 and 2006 Queens were the founding members of the board of directors of the non-profit entity, Kinetic Universe Inc., created in 2007 to administers the Kinetic Grand Championship, 3-day Arcata to Ferndale Kinetic Sculpture Race, and former queens participate in race administration.

Other Kinetic Races select different botanical Queens, including the Rose-Hips Queen of Port Townsend, Washington. In Australia, having already a real queen, the race selects a Goddess to rule over the festivities instead.

See also
 Idiotarod
 Wife carrying
 Wok racing
 Zoobomb

References

External links

 KHUM radio, which covers the Humboldt County event.
 Kinetic Kompendium: 50 Years of Kinetic Sculpture Racing book by Dawn Thomas

World Championship
Kinetic Grand Championship race information for the Annual Grand Championship Kinetic Sculpture Race.
Rutabaga Queens
Photographs of 2006 race in the water
Photos of the 2008 Race in Eureka

Other races
 Lowell Kinetic Sculpture Race Lowell, Massachusetts}
 KineticBaltimore.com including an extensive photo history of the East Coast Championship; Baltimore, Maryland
 Klamath Kinetic Challenge Klamath Falls, Oregon
 Da Vinci Days Kinetic Challenge in Corvallis, Oregon
 Prescott Valley, Arizona Kinetic Sculpture Race
 Port Townsend, Washington Kinetic Sculpture Race
 Kinetic Sculpture Race of Ventura, California
 Colorado Kinetic Sculpture Events

Human-powered transport
Racing
Tourist attractions in Humboldt County, California
Tourist attractions in Baltimore
 Sports competitions in Baltimore
Culture of Baltimore